Postcolonialism  is the critical academic study of the cultural, political and economic legacy of colonialism and imperialism, focusing on the impact of human control and exploitation of colonized people and their lands. More specifically, it is a critical theory analysis of the history, culture, literature, and discourse of (usually European) imperial power.

Postcolonialism encompasses a wide variety of approaches, and theoreticians may not always agree on a common set of definitions. On a simple level, through anthropological study, it may seek to build a better understanding of colonial life—based on the assumption that the colonial rulers are unreliable narrators—from the point of view of the colonized people. On a deeper level, postcolonialism examines the social and political power relationships that sustain colonialism and neocolonialism, including the social, political and cultural narratives surrounding the colonizer and the colonized. This approach may overlap with studies of contemporary history, and may also draw examples from anthropology, historiography, political science, philosophy, sociology, and human geography. Sub-disciplines of postcolonial studies examine the effects of colonial rule on the practice of feminism, anarchism, literature, and Christian thought.

At times, the term postcolonial studies may be preferred to postcolonialism, as the ambiguous term colonialism could refer either to a system of government, or to an ideology or world view underlying that system. However, postcolonialism (i.e., postcolonial studies) generally represents an ideological response to colonialist thought, rather than simply describing a system that comes after colonialism, as the prefix post- may suggest. As such, postcolonialism may be thought of as a reaction to or departure from colonialism in the same way postmodernism is a reaction to modernism; the term postcolonialism itself is modeled on postmodernism, with which it shares certain concepts and methods.

Purpose and basic concepts
As an epistemology (i.e., a study of knowledge, its nature, and verifiability), ethics (moral philosophy), and as a political science (i.e., in its concern with affairs of the citizenry), the field of postcolonialism addresses the matters that constitute the postcolonial identity of a decolonized people, which derives from:

 the colonizer's generation of cultural knowledge about the colonized people; and
 how that Western cultural knowledge was applied to subjugate a non-European people into a colony of the European mother country, which, after initial invasion, was effected by means of the cultural identities of 'colonizer' and 'colonized'.

Postcolonialism is aimed at disempowering such theories (intellectual and linguistic, social and economic) by means of which colonialists "perceive," "understand," and "know" the world. Postcolonial theory thus establishes intellectual spaces for subaltern peoples to speak for themselves, in their own voices, and thus produce cultural discourses of philosophy, language, society, and economy, balancing the imbalanced us-and-them binary power-relationship between the colonist and the colonial subjects.

Colonialist discourse

Colonialism was presented as "the extension of civilization," which ideologically justified the self-ascribed racial and cultural superiority of the Western world over the non-Western world. This concept was espoused by Ernest Renan in La Réforme intellectuelle et morale (1871), whereby imperial stewardship was thought to affect the intellectual and moral reformation of the coloured peoples of the lesser cultures of the world. That such a divinely established, natural harmony among the human races of the world would be possible, because everyone has an assigned cultural identity, a social place, and an economic role within an imperial colony. Thus:

From the mid- to the late-nineteenth century, such racialist group-identity language was the cultural common-currency justifying geopolitical competition amongst the European and American empires and meant to protect their over-extended economies. Especially in the colonization of the Far East and in the late-nineteenth century Scramble for Africa, the representation of a homogeneous European identity justified colonization. Hence, Belgium and Britain, and France and Germany proffered theories of national superiority that justified colonialism as delivering the light of civilization to unenlightened peoples. Notably, la mission civilisatrice, the self-ascribed 'civilizing mission' of the French Empire, proposed that some races and cultures have a higher purpose in life, whereby the more powerful, more developed, and more civilized races have the right to colonize other peoples, in service to the noble idea of "civilization" and its economic benefits.

Postcolonial identity

Postcolonial theory holds that decolonized people develop a postcolonial identity that is based on cultural interactions between different identities (cultural, national, and ethnic as well as gender and class based) which are assigned varying degrees of social power by the colonial society. In postcolonial literature, the anti-conquest narrative analyzes the identity politics that are the social and cultural perspectives of the subaltern colonial subjects—their creative resistance to the culture of the colonizer; how such cultural resistance complicated the establishment of a colonial society; how the colonizers developed their postcolonial identity; and how neocolonialism actively employs the 'us-and-them' binary social relation to view the non-Western world as inhabited by 'the other'.

As an example, consider how neocolonial discourse of geopolitical homogeneity often includes the relegating of decolonized peoples, their cultures, and their countries, to an imaginary place, such as "the Third World." Oftentimes the term "the third World" is over-inclusive: it refers vaguely to large geographic areas comprising several continents and seas, i.e. Africa, Asia, Latin America, and Oceania. Rather than providing a clear or complete description of the area it supposedly refers to, it instead erases distinctions and identities of the groups it claims to represent. A postcolonial critique of this term would analyze the self-justifying usage of such a term, the discourse it occurs within, as well as the philosophical and political functions the language may have. Postcolonial critiques of homogeneous concepts such as the "Arabs," the "First World," "Christendom," and the "Ummah", often aim to show how such language actually does not represent the groups supposedly identified. Such terminology often fails to adequately describe the heterogeneous peoples, cultures, and geography that make them up. Accurate descriptions of the world's peoples, places, and things require nuanced and accurate terms. By including everyone under the Third World concept, it ignores the why those regions or countries are considered Third World and who is responsible.

Difficulty of definition
As a term in contemporary history, postcolonialism occasionally is applied, temporally, to denote the immediate time after the period during which imperial powers retreated from their colonial territories. Such is believed to be a problematic application of the term, as the immediate, historical, political time is not included in the categories of critical identity-discourse, which deals with over-inclusive terms of cultural representation, which are abrogated and replaced by postcolonial criticism. As such, the terms postcolonial and postcolonialism denote aspects of the subject matter that indicate that the decolonized world is an intellectual space "of contradictions, of half-finished processes, of confusions, of hybridity, and of liminalities." As in most critical theory-based research, the lack of clarity in the definition of the subject matter coupled with an open claim to normativity makes criticism of postcolonial discourse problematic, reasserting its dogmatic or ideological status.

In Post-Colonial Drama: Theory, Practice, Politics (1996), Helen Gilbert and Joanne Tompkins clarify the denotational functions, among which:

The term post-colonialism is also applied to denote the Mother Country's neocolonial control of the decolonized country, affected by the legalistic continuation of the economic, cultural, and linguistic power relationships that controlled the colonial politics of knowledge (i.e., the generation, production, and distribution of knowledge) about the colonized peoples of the non-Western world.  The cultural and religious assumptions of colonialist logic remain active practices in contemporary society and are the basis of the Mother Country's neocolonial attitude towards her former colonial subjects—an economical source of labour and raw materials. It acts as a non interchangeable term that links the independent country to its colonizer, depriving countries of their Independence, decades after building their own identities.

Notable theoreticians and theories

Frantz Fanon and subjugation

In The Wretched of the Earth (1961), psychiatrist and philosopher Frantz Fanon analyzes and medically describes the nature of colonialism as essentially destructive. Its societal effects—the imposition of a subjugating colonial identity—is harmful to the mental health of the native peoples who were subjugated into colonies. Fanon writes that the ideological essence of colonialism is the systematic denial of "all attributes of humanity" of the colonized people. Such dehumanization is achieved with physical and mental violence, by which the colonist means to inculcate a servile mentality upon the natives.

For Fanon, the natives must violently resist colonial subjugation. Hence, Fanon describes violent resistance to colonialism as a mentally cathartic practise, which purges colonial servility from the native psyche, and restores self-respect to the subjugated. Thus, Fanon actively supported and participated in the Algerian Revolution (1954–62) for independence from France as a member and representative of the Front de Libération Nationale.

As postcolonial praxis, Fanon's mental-health analyses of colonialism and imperialism, and the supporting economic theories, were partly derived from the essay "Imperialism, the Highest Stage of Capitalism" (1916), wherein Vladimir Lenin described colonial imperialism as an advanced form of capitalism, desperate for growth at all costs, and so requires more and more human exploitation to ensure continually consistent profit-for-investment.

Another key book that predates postcolonial theories is Fanon's Black Skins, White Masks. In this book, Fanon discusses the logic of colonial rule from the perspective of the existential experience of racialized subjectivity. Fanon treats colonialism as a total project which rules every aspect of colonized peoples and their reality. Fanon reflects on colonialism, language, and racism and asserts that to speak a language is to adopt a civilization and to participate in the world of that language. His ideas show the influence of French and German philosophy, since existentialism, phenomenology, and hermeneutics claim that language, subjectivity, and reality are interrelated. However, the colonial situation presents a paradox: when colonial beings are forced to adopt and speak an imposed language which is not their own, they adopt and participate in the world and civilization of the colonized. This language results from centuries of colonial domination which is aimed at eliminating other expressive forms in order to reflect the world of the colonizer. As a consequence, when colonial beings speak as the colonized, they participate in their own oppression and the very structures of alienation are reflected in all aspects of their adopted language.

Edward Said and orientalism
Cultural critic Edward Said is considered by E. San Juan, Jr. as "the originator and inspiring patron-saint of postcolonial theory and discourse" due to his interpretation of the theory of orientalism explained in his 1978 book,  Orientalism. To describe the us-and-them "binary social relation" with which Western Europe intellectually divided the world—into the "Occident" and the "Orient"—Said developed the denotations and connotations of the term orientalism (an art-history term for Western depictions and the study of the Orient). Said's concept (which he also termed "orientalism") is that the cultural representations generated with the us-and-them binary relation are social constructs, which are mutually constitutive and cannot exist independent of each other, because each exists on account of and for the other.

Notably, "the West" created the cultural concept of "the East," which according to Said allowed the Europeans to suppress the peoples of the Middle East, the Indian Subcontinent, and of Asia in general, from expressing and representing themselves as discrete peoples and cultures. Orientalism thus conflated and reduced the non-Western world into the homogeneous cultural entity known as "the East." Therefore, in service to the colonial type of imperialism, the us-and-them orientalist paradigm allowed European scholars to represent the Oriental World as inferior and backward, irrational and wild, as opposed to a Western Europe that was superior and progressive, rational and civil—the opposite of the Oriental Other.

Reviewing Said's Orientalism (1978), A. Madhavan (1993) says that "Said's passionate thesis in that book, now an 'almost canonical study', represented Orientalism as a 'style of thought' based on the antinomy of East and West in their world-views, and also as a 'corporate institution' for dealing with the Orient."

In concordance with philosopher Michel Foucault, Said established that power and knowledge are the inseparable components of the intellectual binary relationship with which Occidentals claim "knowledge of the Orient." That the applied power of such cultural knowledge allowed Europeans to rename, re-define, and thereby control Oriental peoples, places, and things, into imperial colonies. The power-knowledge binary relation is conceptually essential to identify and understand colonialism in general, and European colonialism in particular. Hence,

Nonetheless, critics of the homogeneous "Occident–Orient" binary social relation, say that Orientalism is of limited descriptive capability and practical application, and propose instead that there are variants of Orientalism that apply to Africa and to Latin America. Said response was that the European West applied Orientalism as a homogeneous form of The Other, in order to facilitate the formation of the cohesive, collective European cultural identity denoted by the term "The West."

With this described binary logic, the West generally constructs the Orient subconsciously as its alter ego. Therefore, descriptions of the Orient by the Occident lack material attributes, grounded within the land. This inventive or imaginative interpretation subscribes female characteristics to the Orient and plays into fantasies that are inherent within the West's alter ego. It should be understood that this process draws creativity, amounting an entire domain and discourse.

In Orientalism (p. 6), Said mentions the production of "philology [the study of the history of languages], lexicography [dictionary making], history, biology, political and economic theory, novel-writing and lyric poetry." Therefore, there is an entire industry that exploits the Orient for its own subjective purposes that lack a native and intimate understanding. Such industries become institutionalized and eventually become a resource for manifest Orientalism or a compilation of misinformation about the Orient.

 These subjective fields of academia now synthesize the political resources and think-tanks that are so common in the West today. Orientalism is self-perpetuating to the extent that it becomes normalized within common discourse, making people say things that are latent, impulsive, or not fully conscious of its own self.

Gayatri Spivak and the subaltern
In establishing the Postcolonial definition of the term subaltern, the philosopher and theoretician Gayatri Chakravorty Spivak cautioned against assigning an over-broad connotation. She argues:

Spivak also introduced the terms essentialism and strategic essentialism to describe the social functions of postcolonialism.

Essentialism denotes the perceptual dangers inherent to reviving subaltern voices in ways that might (over) simplify the cultural identity of heterogeneous social groups and, thereby, create stereotyped representations of the different identities of the people who compose a given social group. Strategic essentialism, on the other hand, denotes a temporary, essential group-identity used in the praxis of discourse among peoples. Furthermore, essentialism can occasionally be applied—by the so-described people—to facilitate the subaltern's communication in being heeded, heard, and understood, because strategic essentialism (a fixed and established subaltern identity) is more readily grasped, and accepted, by the popular majority, in the course of inter-group discourse. The important distinction, between the terms, is that strategic essentialism does not ignore the diversity of identities (cultural and ethnic) in a social group, but that, in its practical function, strategic essentialism temporarily minimizes inter-group diversity to pragmatically support the essential group-identity.

Spivak developed and applied Foucault's term epistemic violence to describe the destruction of non-Western ways of perceiving the world and the resultant dominance of the Western ways of perceiving the world. Conceptually, epistemic violence specifically relates to women, whereby the "Subaltern [woman] must always be caught in translation, never [allowed to be] truly expressing herself," because the colonial power's destruction of her culture pushed to the social margins her non–Western ways of perceiving, understanding, and knowing the world.

In June of the year 1600, the Afro–Iberian woman Francisca de Figueroa requested from the King of Spain his permission for her to emigrate from Europe to New Granada, and reunite with her daughter, Juana de Figueroa. As a subaltern woman, Francisca repressed her native African language, and spoke her request in Peninsular Spanish, the official language of Colonial Latin America. As a subaltern woman, she applied to her voice the Spanish cultural filters of sexism, Christian monotheism, and servile language, in addressing her colonial master:

Moreover, Spivak further cautioned against ignoring subaltern peoples as "cultural Others", and said that the West could progress—beyond the colonial perspective—by means of introspective self-criticism of the basic ideas and investigative methods that establish a culturally superior West studying the culturally inferior non–Western peoples. Hence, the integration of the subaltern voice to the intellectual spaces of social studies is problematic, because of the unrealistic opposition to the idea of studying "Others"; Spivak rejected such an anti-intellectual stance by social scientists, and about them said that "to refuse to represent a cultural Other is salving your conscience…allowing you not to do any homework." Moreover, postcolonial studies also reject the colonial cultural depiction of subaltern peoples as hollow mimics of the European colonists and their Western ways; and rejects the depiction of subaltern peoples as the passive recipient-vessels of the imperial and colonial power of the Mother Country. Consequent to Foucault's philosophic model of the binary relationship of power and knowledge, scholars from the Subaltern Studies Collective, proposed that anti-colonial resistance always counters every exercise of colonial power.

Homi K. Bhabha and hybridity
In The Location of Culture (1994), theoretician Homi K. Bhabha argues that viewing the human world as composed of separate and unequal cultures, rather than as an integral human world, perpetuates the belief in the existence of imaginary peoples and places—"Christendom" and the "Islamic World", "First World," "Second World," and the "Third World." To counter such linguistic and sociological reductionism, postcolonial praxis establishes the philosophic value of hybrid intellectual spaces, wherein ambiguity abrogates truth and authenticity; thereby, hybridity is the philosophic condition that most substantively challenges the ideological validity of colonialism.

R. Siva Kumar and alternative modernity 
In 1997, on the occasion of the 50th anniversary of India's Independence, "Santiniketan: The Making of a Contextual Modernism" was an important exhibition curated by R. Siva Kumar at the National Gallery of Modern Art. In his catalogue essay, Kumar introduced the term Contextual Modernism, which later emerged as a postcolonial critical tool in the understanding of Indian art, specifically the works of Nandalal Bose, Rabindranath Tagore, Ramkinkar Baij, and Benode Behari Mukherjee.

In the post-colonial history of art, this marked the departure from Eurocentric unilateral idea of modernism to alternative context sensitive modernisms.

Several terms including Paul Gilroy's counterculture of modernity and Tani E. Barlow's Colonial modernity have been used to describe the kind of alternative modernity that emerged in non-European contexts. Professor Gall argues that 'Contextual Modernism' is a more suited term because "the colonial in colonial modernity does not accommodate the refusal of many in colonized situations to internalize inferiority. Santiniketan's artist teachers' refusal of subordination incorporated a counter vision of modernity, which sought to correct the racial and cultural essentialism that drove and characterized imperial Western modernity and modernism. Those European modernities, projected through a triumphant British colonial power, provoked nationalist responses, equally problematic when they incorporated similar essentialisms."

Dipesh Chakrabarty
In Provincializing Europe (2000), Dipesh Chakrabarty charts the subaltern history of the Indian struggle for independence, and counters Eurocentric, Western scholarship about non-Western peoples and cultures, by proposing that Western Europe simply be considered as culturally equal to the other cultures of the world; that is, as "one region among many" in human geography.

Derek Gregory and the colonial present
Derek Gregory argues the long trajectory through history of British and American colonization is an ongoing process still happening today. In The Colonial Present, Gregory traces connections between the geopolitics of events happening in modern-day Afghanistan, Palestine, and Iraq and links it back to the us-and-them binary relation between the Western and Eastern world. Building upon the ideas of the other and Said's work on orientalism, Gregory critiques the economic policy, military apparatus, and transnational corporations as vehicles driving present-day colonialism. Emphasizing ideas of discussing ideas around colonialism in the present tense, Gregory utilizes modern events such as the September 11 attacks to tell spatial stories around the colonial behavior happening due to the War on Terror.

Amar Acheraiou and Classical influences 
Acheraiou argues that colonialism was a capitalist venture moved by appropriation and plundering of foreign lands and was supported by military force and a discourse that legitimized violence in the name of progress and a universal civilizing mission. This discourse is complex and multi-faceted. It was elaborated in the 19th century by colonial ideologues such as Ernest Renan and Arthur de Gobineau, but its roots reach far back in history.

In Rethinking Postcolonialism: Colonialist Discourse in Modern Literature and the Legacy of Classical Writers, Acheraiou discusses the history of colonialist discourse and traces its spirit to ancient Greece, including Europe's claim to racial supremacy and right to rule over non-Europeans harboured by Renan and other 19th-century colonial ideologues. He argues that modern colonial representations of the colonized as "inferior," "stagnant," and "degenerate" were borrowed from Greek and Latin authors like Lysias (440–380 BC), Isocrates (436–338 BC), Plato (427–327 BC), Aristotle (384–322 BC), Cicero (106–43 BC), and Sallust (86–34 BC), who all considered their racial others—the Persians, Scythians, Egyptians as "backward," "inferior," and "effeminate."

Among these ancient writers Aristotle is the one who articulated more thoroughly these ancient racial assumptions, which served as a source of inspiration for modern colonists. In The Politics, he established a racial classification and ranked the Greeks superior to the rest. He considered them as an ideal race to rule over Asian and other 'barbarian' peoples, for they knew how to blend the spirit of the European "war-like races" with Asiatic "intelligence" and "competence."

Ancient Rome was a source of admiration in Europe since the enlightenment. In France, Voltaire (1694-1778) was one of the most fervent admirers of Rome. He regarded highly the Roman republican values of rationality, democracy, order and justice. In early-18th century Britain, it was poets and politicians like Joseph Addison (1672–1719) and Richard Glover (1712 –1785) who were vocal advocates of these ancient republican values.

It was in the mid-18th century that ancient Greece became a source of admiration among the French and British. This enthusiasm gained prominence in the late-eighteenth century. It was spurred by German Hellenist scholars and English romantic poets, who regarded ancient Greece as the matrix of Western civilization and a model of beauty and democracy. These included: Johann Joachim Winckelmann (1717–1768), Wilhelm von Humboldt (1767–1835), and Goethe (1749–1832), Lord Byron (1788–1824), Samuel Taylor Coleridge (1772–1834), Percy Bysshe Shelley (1792–1822), and John Keats (1795–1821).

In the 19th century, when Europe began to expand across the globe and establish colonies, ancient Greece and Rome were used as a source of empowerment and justification to Western civilizing mission. At this period, many French and British imperial ideologues identified strongly with the ancient empires and invoked ancient Greece and Rome to justify the colonial civilizing project. They urged European colonizers to emulate these "ideal" classical conquerors, whom they regarded as "universal instructors."

For Alexis de Tocqueville (1805–1859), an ardent and influential advocate of la "Grande France," the classical empires were model conquerors to imitate. He advised the French colonists in Algeria to follow the ancient imperial example. In 1841, he stated:[W]hat matters most when we want to set up and develop a colony is to make sure that those who arrive in it are as less estranged as possible, that these newcomers meet a perfect image of their homeland....the thousand colonies that the Greeks founded on the Mediterranean coasts were all exact copies of the Greek cities on which they had been modelled. The Romans established in almost all parts of the globe known to them municipalities which were no more than miniature Romes. Among modern colonizers, the English did the same. Who can prevent us from emulating these European peoples?.The Greeks and Romans were deemed exemplary conquerors and "heuristic teachers," whose lessons were invaluable for modern colonists ideologues. John-Robert Seeley (1834-1895), a history professor at Cambridge and proponent of imperialism stated in a rhetoric which echoed that of Renan that the role of the British Empire was 'similar to that of Rome, in which we hold the position of not merely of ruling but of an educating and civilizing race."

The incorporation of ancient concepts and racial and cultural assumptions into modern imperial ideology bolstered colonial claims to supremacy and right to colonize non-Europeans. Because of these numerous ramifications between ancient representations and modern colonial rhetoric, 19th century's colonialist discourse acquires a "multi-layered" or "palimpsestic" structure. It forms a "historical, ideological and narcissistic continuum," in which modern theories of domination feed upon and blend with "ancient myths of supremacy and grandeur."

Postcolonial literary study
As a literary theory, postcolonialism deals with the literatures produced by the peoples who once were colonized by the European imperial powers (e.g. Britain, France, and Spain) and the literatures of the decolonized countries engaged in contemporary, postcolonial arrangements (e.g. Organisation internationale de la Francophonie and the Commonwealth of Nations) with their former mother countries.

Postcolonial literary criticism comprehends the literatures written by the colonizer and the colonized, wherein the subject matter includes portraits of the colonized peoples and their lives as imperial subjects. In Dutch literature, the Indies Literature includes the colonial and postcolonial genres, which examine and analyze the formation of a postcolonial identity, and the postcolonial culture produced by the diaspora of the Indo-European peoples, the Eurasian folk who originated from Indonesia; the peoples who were the colony of the Dutch East Indies; in the literature, the notable author is Tjalie Robinson.
Waiting for the Barbarians (1980) by J. M. Coetzee depicts the unfair and inhuman situation of people dominated by settlers.

To perpetuate and facilitate control of the colonial enterprise, some colonized people, especially from among the subaltern peoples of the British Empire, were sent to attend university in the Imperial Motherland; they were to become the native-born, but Europeanised, ruling class of colonial satraps. Yet, after decolonization, their bicultural educations originated postcolonial criticism of empire and colonialism, and of the representations of the colonist and the colonized. In the late 20th century, after the dissolution of the USSR in 1991, the constituent Soviet Socialist Republics became the literary subjects of postcolonial criticism, wherein the writers dealt with the legacies (cultural, social, economic) of the Russification of their peoples, countries, and cultures in service to Greater Russia.

Postcolonial literary study is in two categories:

 the study of postcolonial nations; and
 the study of the nations who continue forging a postcolonial national identity.

The first category of literature presents and analyzes the internal challenges inherent to determining an ethnic identity in a decolonized nation.

The second category of literature presents and analyzes the degeneration of civic and nationalist unities consequent to ethnic parochialism, usually manifested as the demagoguery of "protecting the nation," a variant of the us-and-them binary social relation. Civic and national unity degenerate when a patriarchal régime unilaterally defines what is and what is not "the national culture" of the decolonized country: the nation-state collapses, either into communal movements, espousing grand political goals for the postcolonial nation; or into ethnically mixed communal movements, espousing political separatism, as occurred in decolonized Rwanda, the Sudan, and the Democratic Republic of the Congo; thus the postcolonial extremes against which Frantz Fanon warned in 1961.

Application

Middle East
In the essays "Overstating the Arab State" (2001) by Nazih Ayubi, and "Is Jordan Palestine?" (2003) by Raphael Israeli, the authors deal with the psychologically-fragmented postcolonial identity, as determined by the effects (political and social, cultural and economic) of Western colonialism in the Middle East. As such, the fragmented national identity remains a characteristic of such societies, consequence of the imperially convenient, but arbitrary, colonial boundaries (geographic and cultural) demarcated by the Europeans, with which they ignored the tribal and clan relations that determined the geographic borders of the Middle East countries, before the arrival of European imperialists. Hence, the postcolonial literature about the Middle East examines and analyzes the Western discourses about identity formation, the existence and inconsistent nature of a postcolonial national-identity among the peoples of the contemporary Middle East.

In his essay "Who Am I?: The Identity Crisis in the Middle East" (2006), P.R. Kumaraswamy says:

Independence and the end of colonialism did not end social fragmentation and war (civil and international) in the Middle East. In The Search for Arab Democracy: Discourses and Counter-Discourses (2004), Larbi Sadiki says that the problems of national identity in the Middle East are a consequence of the orientalist indifference of the European empires when they demarcated the political borders of their colonies, which ignored the local history and the geographic and tribal boundaries observed by the natives, in the course of establishing the Western version of the Middle East. In the event:[I]n places like Iraq and Jordan, leaders of the new sovereign states were brought in from the outside, [and] tailored to suit colonial interests and commitments. Likewise, most states in the Persian Gulf were handed over to those [Europeanised colonial subjects] who could protect and safeguard imperial interests in the post-withdrawal phase.Moreover, "with notable exceptions like Egypt, Iran, Iraq, and Syria, most [countries]...[have] had to [re]invent, their historical roots" after decolonization, and, "like its colonial predecessor, postcolonial identity owes its existence to force."

Africa

In the late 19th century, the Scramble for Africa (1874–1914) proved to be the tail end of mercantilist colonialism of the European imperial powers, yet, for the Africans, the consequences were greater than elsewhere in the colonized non–Western world. To facilitate the colonization the European empires laid railroads where the rivers and the land proved impassable. The Imperial British railroad effort proved overambitious in the effort of traversing continental Africa, yet succeeded only in connecting colonial North Africa (Cairo) with the colonial south of Africa (Cape Town).

Upon arriving to Africa, Europeans encountered various African civilizations namely the Ashanti Empire, the Benin Empire, the Kingdom of Dahomey, the Buganda Kingdom (Uganda), and the Kingdom of Kongo, all of which were annexed by imperial powers under the belief that they required European stewardship, as proposed and justified in the essay "The African Character" (1830), by G. W. F. Hegel, in keeping with his philosophic opinion that cultures were stages in the course of the historical unfolding of The Absolute. Nigeria was the homeland of the Hausa people, the Yoruba people and the Igbo people; which last were among the first people to develop their history in constructing a postcolonial identity. (See: Things Fall Apart, 1958).

About East Africa, Kenyan writer Ngũgĩ wa Thiong'o wrote Weep Not, Child (1964), the first postcolonial novel about the East African experience of colonial imperialism; as well as Decolonizing the Mind: The Politics of Language in African Literature (1986). In The River Between (1965), with the Mau Mau Uprising (1952–60) as political background, he addresses the postcolonial matters of African religious cultures, and the consequences of the imposition of Christianity, a religion culturally foreign to Kenya and to most of Africa.

In postcolonial countries of Africa, Africans and non–Africans live in a world of genders, ethnicities, classes and languages, of ages, families, professions, religions and nations. There is a suggestion that individualism and postcolonialism are essentially discontinuous and divergent cultural phenomena.

Asia

French Indochina was divided into five subdivisions: Tonkin, Annam, Cochinchina, Cambodia, and Laos. Cochinchina (southern Vietnam) was the first territory under French control; Saigon was conquered in 1859; and in 1887, the Indochinese Union (Union indochinoise) was established.

In 1924, Nguyen Ai Quoc (aka Ho Chi Minh) wrote the first critical text against the French colonization: Le Procès de la Colonisation française ('French Colonization on Trial')

Trinh T. Minh-ha has been developing her innovative theories about postcolonialism in various means of expression, literature, films, and teaching. She is best known for her documentary film Reassemblage (1982), in which she attempts to deconstruct anthropology as a "western male hegemonic ideology." In 1989, she wrote Woman, Native, Other: Writing Postcoloniality and Feminism, in which she focuses on the acknowledgement of oral tradition.

Eastern Europe 
The partitions of Poland (1772–1918) and occupation of Eastern European countries by the Soviet Union after the Second World War were forms of "white" colonialism, for long overlooked by postcolonial theorists. The domination of European empires (Prussian, Austrian, Russian, and later Soviet) over neighboring territories (Belarus, Bulgaria, Czechoslovakia, Hungary, Lithuania, Moldova, Poland, Romania, and Ukraine), consisting in military invasion, exploitation of human and natural resources, devastation of culture, and efforts to re-educate local people in the empires' language, in many ways resembled the violent conquest of overseas territories by Western European powers, despite such factors as geographical proximity and the missing racial difference.

Postcolonial studies in East-Central and Eastern Europe were inaugurated by Ewa M. Thompson's seminal book Imperial Knowledge: Russian Literature and Colonialism (2000), followed by works of Aleksander Fiut, Hanna Gosk, Violeta Kelertas, Dorota Kołodziejczyk, Janusz Korek, Dariusz Skórczewski, Bogdan Ştefănescu, and Tomasz Zarycki.

Ireland 

Ireland experienced centuries of English/British colonialism between the 12th and 18th centuries - notably the Statute of Drogheda, 1494, which subordinated the Irish Parliament to the English (later, British) government - before the Kingdom of Ireland merged with the Kingdom of Great Britain on 1 January 1801 as the United Kingdom. Most of Ireland became independent of the U.K. in 1922 as the Irish Free State, a self-governing dominion of the British Empire. Pursuant to the Statute of Westminster, 1931 and enactment of a new Irish Constitution, Éire became fully independent of the United Kingdom in 1937; and then became a republic in 1949. Northern Ireland, in northeastern Ireland (northwestern Ireland is part of the Republic of Ireland), remains a province of the United Kingdom. Many scholars have drawn parallels between:

the economic, cultural and social subjugation of Ireland, and the experiences of the colonized regions of the world
the depiction of the native Gaelic Irish as wild, tribal savages and the depiction of other indigenous peoples as primitive and violent
the partition of Ireland by the U.K. government, analogous to the partitioning and boundary-drawing of the other future nation states by colonial powers
the post-independence struggle of the Irish Free State (which became the Republic of Ireland in 1949) to establish economic independence and its own identity in the world, and the similar struggles of other post-colonial nations; though, uniquely, Ireland had been independent, then become part of the U.K., then mostly independent again Ireland's membership of and support for the European Union has often been framed as an attempt to break away from the United Kingdom's economic orbit.

In 2003, Clare Carroll wrote in Ireland and Postcolonial Theory that "the "colonizing activities" of Raleigh, Gilbert, and Drake in Ireland can be read as a "rehearsal" for their later exploits in the Americas, and argues that the English Elizabethans represent the Irish as being more alien than the contemporary European representations of Native Americans."

Rachel Seoighe wrote in 2017, "Ashis Nandy describes how colonisation impacts on the native’s interior life: the meaning of the Irish language was bound up with loss of self in socio-cultural and political life. The purportedly wild and uncivilised Irish language itself was held responsible for the ‘backwardness’ of the people. Holding tight to your own language was thought to bring death, exile and poverty. These ideas and sentiments are recognised by Seamus Deane in his analysis of recorded memories and testimony of the Great Famine in the 1840s. The recorded narratives of people who starved, emigrated and died during this period reflect an understanding of the Irish language as complicit in the devastation of the economy and society. It was perceived as a weakness of a people expelled from modernity: their native language prevented them from casting off ‘tradition’ and ‘backwardness’ and entering the ‘civilised’ world, where English was the language of modernity, progress and survival."

The Troubles (1969–1998), a period of conflict in Northern Ireland between mostly Cathlolic and Gaelic Irish nationalists (who wish to join the Irish Republic) and mostly Protestant Scots-Irish and Anglo-Irish unionists (who are a majority of the population and wish to remain part of the United Kingdom) has been described as a post-colonial conflict. In Jacobin, Daniel Finn criticised journalism which portrayed the conflict as one of "ancient hatred", ignoring the imperial context.

Structural adjustment programmes (SAPs) 
Structural adjustment programmes (SAPs) implemented by the World Bank and IMF are viewed by some postcolonialists as the modern procedure of colonization. Structural adjustment programmes (SAPs) calls for trade liberalization, privatization of banks, health care, and educational institutions. These implementations minimized government's role, paved pathways for companies to enter Africa for its resources. Limited to production and exportation of cash crops, many African nations acquired more debt, and were left stranded in a position where acquiring more loan and continuing to pay high interest became an endless cycle.

The Dictionary of Human Geography uses the definition of colonialism as "enduring relationship of domination and mode of dispossession, usually (or at least initially) between an indigenous (or enslaved) majority and a minority of interlopers (colonizers), who are convinced of their own superiority, pursue their own interests, and exercise power through a mixture of coercion, persuasion, conflict and collaboration." This definition suggests that the SAPs implemented by the Washington Consensus is indeed an act of colonization.

Criticism

Undermining of universal values 

Indian-American Marxist scholar Vivek Chibber has critiqued some foundational logics of postcolonial theory in his book Postcolonial Theory and the Specter of Capital. Drawing on Aijaz Ahmad's earlier critique of Said's Orientalism and Sumit Sarkar's critique of the Subaltern Studies scholars, Chibber focuses on and refutes the principal historical claims made by the Subaltern Studies scholars; claims that are representative of the whole of postcolonial theory. Postcolonial theory, he argues, essentializes cultures, painting them as fixed and static categories. Moreover, it presents the difference between East and West as unbridgeable, hence denying people's "universal aspirations" and "universal interests." He also criticized the postcolonial tendency to characterize all of Enlightenment values as Eurocentric. According to him, the theory will be remembered "for its revival of cultural essentialism and its acting as an endorsement of orientalism, rather than being an antidote to it."

Fixation on national identity 

The concentration of postcolonial studies upon the subject of national identity has determined it is essential to the creation and establishment of a stable nation and country in the aftermath of decolonization; yet indicates that either an indeterminate or an ambiguous national identity has tended to limit the social, cultural, and economic progress of a decolonized people. In Overstating the Arab State (2001) by Nazih Ayubi, Moroccan scholar Bin 'Abd al-'Ali proposed that the existence of "a pathological obsession with...identity" is a cultural theme common to the contemporary academic field Middle Eastern Studies.

Nevertheless, Kumaraswamy and Sadiki say that such a common sociological problem—that of an indeterminate national identity—among the countries of the Middle East is an important aspect that must be accounted in order to have an understanding of the politics of the contemporary Middle East. In the event, Ayubi asks if what 'Bin Abd al–'Ali sociologically described as an obsession with national identity might be explained by "the absence of a championing social class?"

In his essay The Death of Postcolonialism: The Founder's Foreword, Mohamed Salah Eddine Madiou argues that postcolonialism as an academic study and critique of colonialism is a "dismal failure." While explaining that Edward Said never affiliated himself with the postcolonial discipline and is, therefore, not "the father" of it as most would have us believe, Madiou, borrowing from Barthes' and Spivak's death-titles (The Death of the Author and Death of a Discipline, respectively), argues that postcolonialism is today not fit to study colonialism and is, therefore, dead "but continue[s] to be used which is the problem." Madiou gives one clear reason for considering postcolonialism a dead discipline: the avoidance of serious colonial cases, such as Palestine.

Postcolonial literature

Foundation works
Some works written prior to the formal establishment of postcolonial studies as a discipline have been considered retroactively as works of postcolonialist theory.
 1924. Le Procès de la Colonisation française ('French Colonization on Trial'), by Nguyen Ai Quoc (aka Ho Chi Minh)
 1950. Discourse on Colonialism, by Aimé Césaire
 1952. Black Skin, White Masks, by Frantz Fanon
 1961. The Wretched of the Earth, by Frantz Fanon
 1965. The Colonizer and the Colonized, by Albert Memmi
 1970. Consciencism, by Kwame Nkrumah
 1978. Orientalism, by Edward Said
 1988. Can the Subaltern Speak?, by Gayatri Chakravorty Spivak

Contemporary authors of postcolonial fiction

 John Nkemngong Nkengasong (1959–)
 Chinua Achebe (1930–2013)
 Chimamanda Ngozi Adichie (1977–)
 Ama Ata Aidoo (1942–)
 Mariama Ba (1929–1981)
 Giannina Braschi(1953–)
 Edwidge Danticat(1969–)
 Buchi Emecheta (1944–2018)
 Amitav Ghosh (1956–)
 Abdulrazak Gurnah (1948–)
 Mohsin Hamid (1971–) 
 Jamaica Kincaid (1949–)
 Jhumpa Lahiri (1967–) 
 Ben Okri (1959–) 
 Michael Ondaatje (1943–) 
 Arundhati Roy (1961–) 
 Jean Rhys (1890–1979) 
 Salman Rushdie (1947–) 
 Sam Selvon (1923–1994) 
 Ousmane Sembene (1923–2007) 
 Bapsi Sidhwa (1938–)
 Zadie Smith (1975–)
 Wole Soyinka (1934–)
 Ngugi wa Thiong'o (1938–) 
 Derek Walcott (1930–2017)

Postcolonial non-fiction

Pre-2000 
Alatas, Syed Hussein. 1977. The Myth of the Lazy Native.
Anderson, Benedict. [1983] 1991. Imagined Communities: Reflections on the Origin and Spread of Nationalism. London: Verso. .
Ashcroft, B., G. Griffiths, and H. Tiffin. 1990. The Empire Writes Back: Theory and Practice in Post-Colonial Literature.
——, eds. 1995. The Post-Colonial Studies Reader. London: Routledge. .
——, eds. 1998. Key Concepts in Post-Colonial Studies. London: Routledge.
Amin, Samir. 1988. L'eurocentrisme ('Eurocentrism'). 
Balagangadhara, S. N. [1994] 2005. "The Heathen in his Blindness..." Asia, the West, and the Dynamic of Religion. Manohar books. .
Bhabha, Homi K. 1994. The Location of Culture.
Chambers, I., and L. Curti, eds. 1996. The Post-Colonial Question. Routledge.
Chatterjee, P. Nation and Its Fragments: Colonial and Postcolonial Histories. Princeton University Press.
Gandhi, Leela. 1998. Postcolonial Theory: A Critical Introduction. Columbia University Press: .
Guevara, Che. 11 December 1964. "Colonialism is Doomed" (speech). 19th General Assembly of the United Nations. Havana.
Minh-ha, Trinh T. 1989. Woman, Native, Other: Writing Postcoloniality and Feminism. Indiana University Press.
German edition: trans. Kathrina Menke. Vienna & Berlin: Verlag Turia & Kant. 2010.
Japanese edition: trans. Kazuko Takemura. Tokyo: Iwanami Shoten. 1995.
—— 1989. Infinite Layers/Third World?
Hashmi, Alamgir. 1998. The Commonwealth, Comparative Literature and the World: Two Lectures. Islamabad: Gulmohar.
Hountondji, Paulin J. 1983. African Philosophy: Myth & Reality.
Jayawardena, Kumari. 1986. Feminism and Nationalism in the Third World.
 JanMohamed, A. 1988. Manichean Aesthetics: The Politics of Literature in Colonial Africa.
Kiberd, Declan. 1995. Inventing Ireland.
 Lenin, Vladimir. 1916. Imperialism, the Highest Stage of Capitalism.
Mannoni, Octave, and P. Powesland. Prospero and Caliban, the Psychology of Colonization.
Nandy, Ashis. 1983. The Intimate Enemy: Loss and Recovery of Self Under Colonialism.
 —— 1987. Traditions, Tyranny, and Utopias: Essays in the Politics of Awareness.
McClintock, Anne. 1994. "The Angel of Progress: Pitfalls of the Term 'Postcolonialism'." In Colonial Discourse/Postcolonial Theory, edited by M. Baker, P. Hulme, and M. Iverson.
 Mignolo, Walter. 1999. Local Histories/Global designs: Coloniality.
Mohanty, Chandra Talpade. 1986. Under Western Eyes.
Mudimbe, V. Y. 1988. The Invention of Africa.
Narayan, Uma. 1997. Dislocating Cultures.
 —— 1997. Contesting Cultures.
 Parry, B. 1983. Delusions and Discoveries.
Raja, Masood Ashraf. "Postcolonial Student: Learning the Ethics of Global Solidarity in an English Classroom."
Quijano, Aníbal. [1991] 1999. "Coloniality and Modernity/Rationality." In Globalizations and Modernities.
Retamar, Roberto Fernández. [1971] 1989 . "Calibán: Apuntes sobre la cultura de Nuestra América" ['Caliban: Notes About the Culture of Our America']. In Calibán and Other Essays.
Said, Edward. 1993. Culture and Imperialism.
Spivak, Gayatri Chakravorty. 1988. Can the Subaltern Speak?
 —— 1988. Selected Subaltern Studies.
 —— 1990. The Postcolonial Critic.
 —— 1999. A Critique of Postcolonial Reason: Towards a History of the Vanishing Present.
wa Thiong'o, Ngũgĩ. 1986. Decolonizing the Mind: The Politics of Language in African Literature.
 Young, Robert J. C. 1990. White Mythologies: Writing History and the West.
 —— 1995. Colonial Desire: Hybridity in Theory, Culture and Race.

After 2000 

 Ankerl, G. 2000. Coexisting Contemporary Civilizations. Geneva: Indiana University Press. .
 Bachetta, Paola. 2012. Cahiers du CEDREF on Decolonial Feminist and Queer Theories.
Dabashi, Hamid. 2007. Iran: A People Interrupted.
 Dean, B., and J. Levi, eds. 2003.  At the Risk of Being Heard: Indigenous Rights, Identity, and Postcolonial States. University of Michigan Press. .
 Dhawan, N. 2005. "Postkolonial Theorie. Eine kritische Einführung" ['Postcolonial Theory: A Critical Enquiry'].
 Mbembe, Achille. 2000. On the Postcolony. Regents of the University of California.
 McLeod, John. 2000. Beginning Postcolonialism.
 2010. Beginning Postcolonialism (2nd ed.). Manchester University Press.
Mignolo, Walter. 2005. The Idea of Latin América.
 Paperson, L. 2005. "The Postcolonial Ghetto." .
 Poddar, Prem, and David Johnson, ed. 2008. A Historical Companion to Postcolonial Literatures in English. Edinburgh: Edinburgh University Press. . Retrieved 2016-02-23.
Prine, Richard. 2014. The Disappointed Bridge: Ireland and the Post-Colonial World.
 Risam, Roopika. 2018. New Digital Worlds: Postcolonial Digital Humanities in Theory, Praxis, and Pedagogy.
 Salzman, Philip C., and D. Robinson Divine, eds. 2008. Postcolonial Theory and the Arab–Israeli Conflict. Routledge.
 Young, Robert J. C. 2001. Postcolonialism: An Historical Introduction.

Scholarly projects 
In an effort to understand postcolonialism through scholarship and technology, in addition to important literature, many stakeholders have published projects about the subject. Here is an incomplete list of projects.

The Institute of Postcolonial Studies, based in Naarm/Melbourne, is an independent public education project dedicated to research and addressing contemporary matters informed by postcolonial and critical inquiry. IPCS edits the well-known journal Postcolonial Studies (published with Taylor and Francis). 
 Bodies and Structure (2019), on the spatial history of Japan and its empire
Chicana Diasporic (2018), a research hub that highlights the Chicana Caucus of the National Women's Caucus from 1973 to 1979
Harlem Shadows (2018), an open source collection of Claude McKay's 1922 collection of poems
 Passamaquoddy People: At Home on the Oceans and Lakes (2014), a digital archive of photos and recordings of the Passamaquoddy people
 Postcolonial Writers Make Worlds (2017), critical reading of Black and Asian British literature
 Torn Apart/Separados (2018), visualizations and scholarly journal tracking global crisis situations
 W.E.B. Du Bois's Data Portraits: Visualizing Black America (2019), charts from W.E.B. Du Bois in color about the lives of Black Americans

See also

 Ali Shariati 
 Amina Wadud 
 Anticolonialism 
 Audre Lorde
 Burn! (1969), directed by Gillo Pontecorvo
 Cultural cringe
 Cross-culturalism
 Decolonization
 The Dogs of War (1980), directed by John Irvin
 Ethnology
 Fatima Mernissi 
 An Image of Africa: Racism in Conrad's "Heart of Darkness" (1975), by Chinua Achebe
 Inversion in postcolonial theory
 Leila Ahmed
 Linguistic imperialism
 Lila Abu-Lughod
 Kimberlé Crenshaw
 Kecia Ali 
 Nation-building
 Paulo Freire 
 Postcolonial anarchism
 Postcolonial feminism
 Postcolonial theology
 Post-communism
 Ranajit Guha
 Ranjit Hoskote
 Robert J.C. Young
 Saba Mahmood
 Street name controversy
 Talal Asad
 Teju Cole, "The White-Savior Industrial Complex," The Atlantic

References

Further reading

External links

The Institute of Postcolonial Studies
Postcolonial Studies
Contemporary Postcolonial and Postimperial Literature
Postcolonial Space
Postcolonial Interventions

 
Critical theory
Neocolonialism
Africana philosophy
Postmodern theory
Post-structuralism